Clément Jordan Badin (born 26 May 1993) is a French professional footballer who plays as a winger for Championnat National 2 club Fleury.

Career
Born in Bruges, Gironde, Badin played for lowly sides AS Saint-Yzan de Soudiac and FC Saint André de Cubzac before joining Libourne in 2006, aged 13. He made his senior debuts with the latter in the CFA 2, appearing in two league matches as his side were relegated.

In June 2012 Badin moved to CFA's Trélissac. After appearing regularly he moved to Bordeaux in May of the following year, being assigned to the reserves also in the fourth level. On 4 June 2014, Badin signed a one-year professional deal with Bordeaux, being also promoted to the main squad. He played his first match as a professional on 28 October, coming on as a late substitute in a 3–1 Coupe de la Ligue away win against Toulouse. On 30 January 2015, Badin was loaned to Spanish Segunda División B side Real Avilés until the end of the season.

References

External links

1995 births
Living people
People from Bruges, Gironde
Sportspeople from Gironde
French footballers
Association football wingers
FC Libourne players
Trélissac FC players
FC Girondins de Bordeaux players
Real Avilés CF footballers
Bergerac Périgord FC players
Blois Football 41 players
FC Fleury 91 players
Championnat National 2 players
Segunda División B players
French expatriate footballers
French expatriate sportspeople in Spain
Expatriate footballers in Spain
Footballers from Nouvelle-Aquitaine